Howmeh Rural District is a rural district (dehestan) in the Central District of Shirvan County, North Khorasan Province, Iran. At the 2006 census, its population was 7,297, in 1,989 families.  The rural district has 18 villages.

References 

Rural Districts of North Khorasan Province
Shirvan County